Don't Call Me may refer to:

Don't Call Me (album), a 2021 album by Shinee
"Don't Call Me" (Shinee song)
"Don't Call Me", song by The Swon Brothers
"Don't Call Me", song by MAX from the single "Love Screw"
"Don't Call Me", song by Johnny Warman
"Don't Call Me", song by the Highwomen from their 2019 self-titled album